Semalea sextilis, the dark skipper or silky skipper, is a butterfly in the family Hesperiidae. It is found in Guinea, Sierra Leone, Liberia, Ivory Coast, Ghana, Nigeria, Cameroon, Gabon, the Republic of the Congo, the Central African Republic, the Democratic Republic of the Congo, Uganda, western Kenya, western Tanzania and Zambia. The habitat consists of forests.

References

Butterflies described in 1886
Erionotini
Butterflies of Africa